Hakimuddin Shabbir Habibulla (born 25 September 1979) is an Indian former swimmer, who specialized in middle-distance freestyle events. He represented India at the 2000 Summer Olympics.

Career
Habibulla competed only in the men's 200 m freestyle at the 2000 Summer Olympics in Sydney. He received a Universality place from FINA in an entry time of 1:56.11. He challenged four other swimmers in heat one, including Uzbekistan's two-time Olympian Oleg Tsvetkovskiy. Coming from third at the first turn, Habibulla finished the race to a fourth seed in a time of 1:58.35, finishing behind the leader Tsvetskovskiy by 3.42 seconds. Habibulla failed to advance into the semifinals, as he placed 50th overall in the prelims.

Habibulla was co-founder of GoSports India Pvt. Ltd., a sports management company based in Bangalore, which works towards development of young talent in Olympic sports. He was also the Founder Trustee of the GoSports Foundation.

Habibulla is currently the founder and principal consultant for sports performance at Winning Matters Consulting Pvt. Ltd., a sports consulting firm.

References

External links

1979 births
Living people
Indian male swimmers
Indian male freestyle swimmers
Indian Ismailis
Dawoodi Bohras
Olympic swimmers of India
Swimmers at the 2000 Summer Olympics
Swimmers from Bangalore
South Asian Games gold medalists for India
South Asian Games medalists in swimming